Sea pottery (also known as "sea china" or "sea porcelain" or "beach pottery") is pottery which is broken into worn pieces and shards and found on beaches along oceans or large lakes. Sea pottery has been tumbled and smoothed by the water and sand, creating small pieces of smooth, frosted pottery. It is often collected with more common sea glass by beachcombers.

Origins
Sea pottery originates from pottery, including earthenware, stoneware and porcelain which breaks into smaller pieces and is smoothed by the acidity and motion of an ocean or lake, the sand or grit polishes the edges like a natural tumbler. Much of the sea pottery in the United Kingdom and United States originated from discarded 18th and 19th century porcelain made in Europe and America. Some sea pottery contains discernible patterns, such as flowers, figures, historic places and scenes, or hallmarks, factory stamps and dates which allow the pottery to be dated using pottery reference guides.

Uses
Sea pottery is often used in household decorations and furnishings as well as jewellery. Some enthusiasts fill jars with sea pottery to display. Because most sea pottery originates from turn of the 20th century ceramics (glass and ceramics were used more widely for consumables before plastic)  it is becoming increasingly less common to find these pieces.

References

External links
 
 

Collecting
Ceramic materials
Pottery